Josh Dunne (born December 8, 1998) is an American professional ice hockey forward who is currently playing for the  Columbus Blue Jackets of the National Hockey League (NHL).

Playing career
Dunne played collegiate hockey for the Clarkson Golden Knights in the NCAA. He signed as an undrafted free agent with the Columbus Blue Jackets on March 14, 2021.

In the 2020–21 season, Dunne joined the Blue Jackets' AHL affiliate, making his professional debut with the Cleveland Monsters. After 7 games with the Monsters, Dunne was recalled by Columbus and made his NHL debut in a 4-1 defeat against the Dallas Stars on April 15, 2021.

Career statistics

Awards and honors

References

External links

1998 births
Living people
American men's ice hockey forwards
Clarkson Golden Knights men's ice hockey players
Cleveland Monsters players
Columbus Blue Jackets players
Green Bay Gamblers players
Undrafted National Hockey League players